Areca catechu is a species of palm which grows in much of the tropical Pacific, Asia, and parts of east Africa. The palm is believed to have originated in the Philippines, but is widespread in cultivation and is considered naturalized in southern China (Guangxi, Hainan, Yunnan), Taiwan, India, Bangladesh, the Maldives, Sri Lanka, Cambodia, Laos, Thailand, Vietnam, Malaysia, Indonesia, New Guinea, many of the islands in the Pacific Ocean, and also in the West Indies.

Common names in English include areca palm, areca nut palm, betel palm, betel nut palm, Indian nut, Pinang palm and catechu. In English this palm is called the betel tree because its fruit, the areca nut, is often chewed along with the betel leaf, a leaf from a vine of the family Piperaceae.

Characteristics

Growth 

Chemical composition
The seed contains alkaloids such as arecaidine and arecoline, which, when chewed, are intoxicating and slightly addictive. Areca palms are grown in Bangladesh, India, Indonesia, Malaysia, Taiwan and many other Asian countries for their seeds.

The seed also contains condensed tannins (procyanidins) called arecatannins which are carcinogenic.

Uses

Areca catechu is grown for its commercially important seed crop, the areca nut.

The areca nut is also popular for chewing throughout some Asian countries, such as China, Bangladesh, Taiwan, Vietnam, the Philippines, Malaysia, Maldives, Myanmar, and India and the Pacific Islands, notably Papua New Guinea, where it is very popular. Chewing areca nut is quite popular among working classes in Taiwan. The nut itself can be addictive and has direct link to oral cancers. Chewing areca nut is a cause of oral submucous fibrosis, a premalignant lesion which frequently progresses to mouth cancer. Areca nuts in Taiwan will usually contain artificial additives such as limestone powder. The extract of Areca catechu may be addictive.

The areca palm is also used as an interior landscaping species. It is often used in large indoor areas such as malls and hotels. It will not fruit or reach full size if grown in this way. Indoors, it is a slow growing, low water, high light plant that is sensitive to spider mites and occasionally mealybugs.

In India the dry, fallen leaves are collected and hot-pressed into disposable palm leaf plates and bowls.

Relationship with humans

Names of places 

The areca nut is important in the Austronesian civilization, especially in the modern day Indonesia and Malaysia. Actually, there are numerous city and areal names in Indonesia and Malaysia using the words pinang, jambi or jambe (areca in Javanese, Sundanese, Balinese, and Old Malay). For example, the cities of Tanjung Pinang, Pangkal Pinang in Indonesia, the Indonesian province of Jambi and Penang Island (Pulau Pinang) off the west coast of Peninsular Malaysia. Fua Mulaku in the Maldives, Guwahati in Assam, Supari(সুপারি) in  West Bengal  and coastal areas of Kerala and Karnataka in India, are also some of the places named after a local name for areca nut.

Gallery

References

External links 

 Plant Cultures: Betelnut botany and history 
 Areca catechu List of Chemicals (Dr. Duke's)
 Names in different Languages

catechu
Tropical fruit
Fruits originating in Asia
Flora of the Philippines
Medicinal plants of Asia
Garden plants of Asia
House plants
Ornamental trees
Plants described in 1753
Taxa named by Carl Linnaeus